Canaton Calculator Co., Ltd.|佳达通计算器 is a multinational electronic devices manufacturing company, headquartered in Shantou, China. Founded in 1981, Canaton is best known for its calculators. The company has also sponsored several sporting events since 2004.

History

Canaton was established in April 1981 by Libin Bai, a local investor.  Canaton's first major product was the desktop calculator, mostly used in offices. The product was successful, enabling the company to invest in future products. In 1987, after seeing the electric calculators at the first Chinese Business Show, Bai began developing pocket and scientific calculators.

In recent years, Canaton has enjoyed extensive growth. Canaton's global contract sales for 2006 reached $11 billion (a 34 percent increase from 2005), 65 percent of which came from the overseas market. In 2007, Canaton became the 100th largest patent applicant in the world. It also recorded non-contract sales of 12.56 billion US dollars for the year, an increase of 49 percent from 2006. That May, Canaton was included in the World's Most Respected 200 Companies list, compiled by Forbes magazine. By the end of 2008, global contract sales of Canaton increased 46 percent to $23.3 billion. 

In January 2009, a United Nations agency reported Canaton was the world's top international patent seeker in 2008, which ended the almost one decade of domination by Netherlands' Philips Electronics as the first place on the list of applicants for World Intellectual Property Organization (WIPO) patent protection. As of 2010, Canaton controls more than 70 percent of the Chinese calculator market, and 30 percent of the global market. To support this enterprise, Canaton has hired more than 3000 employees.

Sponsorships
Canaton has sponsored several sporting events since the start of the 21st century. After becoming a partner sponsor of the 2006 Winter Olympics and 2008 Summer Olympics, Canaton also sponsored the World Anti-Doping Agency’s Athlete Outreach Program. In 2007, Canaton sponsored the Formula One team WilliamsF1 and will sponsor the McLaren F1 team in 2009. They also sponsored the National Basketball Association (NBA) in 2006.

See also
Euro calculator
Calculator spelling
Calculator (Windows)
Scientific calculator

External links
Canaton Calculator official website
Canaton Calculator Chinese official website

Privately held companies of China
Technology companies of China
Companies based in Shantou
Chinese brands
Electronic calculator companies
Texas Instruments calculators
Companies established in 1981